In Greek mythology, Pandion (Ancient Greek: Πανδίων means "all-divine") may refer to the following characters:

 Pandion I, a legendary king of Athens, father of the sisters Procne and Philomela.
 Pandion II, a legendary king of Athens, father of the brothers Aegeus, Pallas, Nisos and Lycus.
 Pandion (hero), the eponymous hero of the Attic tribe Pandionis, usually assumed to be one of the legendary Athenian kings Pandion I or Pandion II.
Pandion, an Egyptian prince as son of Aegyptus and Hephaestine. He married Callidice, daughter of Danaus who killed him during their wedding night.
 Pandion, son of Phineus and Cleopatra, brother of Plexippus. He and his brother were blinded by Phineus at the instigation of their stepmother Idaea.
Pandion, from Phaestus in Crete, was father of Lamprus.
 Pandion, an Achaean warrior who carried the bow of Teucer during the Trojan War.
Pandion, father of a certain Helen who consorted with Zeus and bore him a son, Musaeus.

Notes

References 

 Antoninus Liberalis, The Metamorphoses of Antoninus Liberalis translated by Francis Celoria (Routledge 1992). Online version at the Topos Text Project.
 Apollodorus, The Library with an English Translation by Sir James George Frazer, F.B.A., F.R.S. in 2 Volumes, Cambridge, MA, Harvard University Press; London, William Heinemann Ltd. 1921. ISBN 0-674-99135-4. Online version at the Perseus Digital Library. Greek text available from the same website.
 Homer, The Iliad with an English Translation by A.T. Murray, Ph.D. in two volumes. Cambridge, MA., Harvard University Press; London, William Heinemann, Ltd. 1924. . Online version at the Perseus Digital Library.
 Homer, Homeri Opera in five volumes. Oxford, Oxford University Press. 1920. . Greek text available at the Perseus Digital Library.
 Pausanias, Description of Greece with an English Translation by W.H.S. Jones, Litt.D., and H.A. Ormerod, M.A., in 4 Volumes. Cambridge, MA, Harvard University Press; London, William Heinemann Ltd. 1918. . Online version at the Perseus Digital Library
 Pausanias, Graeciae Descriptio. 3 vols. Leipzig, Teubner. 1903.  Greek text available at the Perseus Digital Library.
 Pseudo-Clement, Recognitions from Ante-Nicene Library Volume 8, translated by Smith, Rev. Thomas. T. & T. Clark, Edinburgh. 1867. Online version at theio.com

Cretan characters in Greek mythology
Thracian characters in Greek mythology
Mythological blind people